"Bodies" is the debut single by the American rock band Drowning Pool, released in May 2001 from their debut album Sinner. "Bodies" is Drowning Pool's signature song and has been featured in various films, TV programs, and advertisements since its release. It was also the theme song for the 2001 WWF SummerSlam pay-per-view event, as well as that of the ECW brand in 2006 to early 2008. During 2001, the song became popular, but the song was taken off radio stations after the September 11 attacks because it was considered inappropriate in the wake of the terrorist attacks.

An early version of "Bodies" appeared on their EP Pieces of Nothing, omitting the lyrics in the bridge and featuring a significantly greater amount of screaming.

Music and lyrics
Considered a nu metal song, "Bodies" features a heavy use of the lyric "let the bodies hit the floor". Its lyrics build by gradually counting up from one to four, shouting the number each time, until reaching its intense chorus.  Clean vocals in the song's verses make a contrast from the many harsh vocals elsewhere. The guitar structure of "Bodies" features a heavy use of the wah pedal.

Drowning Pool's original vocalist Dave Williams talked about "Bodies" on Uranium, saying

Commercial performance and critical reception

Commercial performance
The song peaked at number 6 on the Billboard Mainstream Rock Tracks chart in August 2001, and No. 12 on the Alternative Songs charts in September 2001. The song was certified gold by the Recording Industry Association of America on June 24, 2008, then certified platinum on January 31, 2019 with a million digital copies sold. The song re-entered the chart in April 2016 and reached No. 6 on the Hard Rock Digital Song and No. 30 on the Rock Digital Songs charts. It has sold 1,751,000 digital copies in the US as of April 2016. On September 22, 2001, "Bodies" peaked at number 19 on the Bubbling Under Hot 100 Singles chart. It also reached number 34 on the UK Singles Chart.

Critical reception
Rolling Stone called "Bodies" "Drowning Pool's finest moment on" Sinner.

Music video
Much like the song's radio success, the "Bodies" music video found significant airplay on various music channels in 2001. Directed by Glen Bennett, it has the band performing in what appears to be a psychiatric hospital, with Williams screaming the lyrics into the ear of a man strapped to a chair. Clips from the video were later used in the title animation for the music program Uranium.

Usage in media
The song is used in the film trailers of Stop-Loss (2008). It is also used in the opening scene of The One (2001).

Controversy and military's use of the song
Due to the misinterpretation of its lyrics, the song created controversy. In 2011, the song was linked to the shooting of Congresswoman Gabby Giffords, after it was discovered that the perpetrator, Jared Lee Loughner, had saved an unofficial music video for the song as a favorite on his YouTube account. In response, the band issued a statement concerning the link: "We were devastated this weekend to learn of the tragic events that occurred in Arizona and that our music has been misinterpreted. 'Bodies' was written about the brotherhood of the moshpit and was never about violence." The band also added: "For someone to put out a video misinterpreting a song about a moshpit as fuel for a violent act shows just how sick they really are. We support those who do what they can to keep America safe. Our hearts go out to the victims and their families of this terrible tragedy".

The song was used by interrogators at the Guantanamo Bay detention camps in 2003. "Bodies" was repeatedly played over a 10-day period during the interrogation of Mohamedou Ould Salahi while he was "exposed to variable lighting patterns" at the same time. In 2006, Drowning Pool bassist Stevie Benton took pride in the military usage of the song. He said: "People assume we should be offended that somebody in the military thinks our song is annoying enough that, played over and over, it can psychologically break someone down. I take it as an honor to think that perhaps our song could be used to quell another 9/11 attack or something like that."

Track listing

Limited EP

Vinyl

Bodies Remix Guitar Down promo CD

Promo CD

'''Promo CD #2

Charts

Certifications

References

External links
 Official music video – YouTube

2001 songs
2001 debut singles
ECW (WWE brand)
Drowning Pool songs
Music controversies
Obscenity controversies in music
Wind-up Records singles
Songs written by Stevie Benton
Internet memes